Barrow Creek is a very small town, with a current population of 11, in the southern Northern Territory of Australia. It is located on the Stuart Highway, about 280 km north of Alice Springs, about halfway from there to Tennant Creek. The main feature of the town is the roadhouse/hotel. A number of mining companies are currently exploring in the area, although none of the current residents are involved in the mining industry.

History

Indigenous people
The Barrow Creek area is the traditional home of the Kaytetye Aboriginal people.  Humans have lived in Australia, and perhaps this area, for at least 40,000 years.

European settlement
With the arrival of Europeans in the latter part of the 19th century, settlers competed with the Kaytetye for land and resources. Cultural misunderstandings on land and property rights resulted in mutual killings.

John McDouall Stuart passed through the area in 1860. Stuart named a creek near the current town after John Henry Barrow, a preacher, journalist and politician who was born in England in 1817 and migrated to South Australia in 1853. At the time of first European habitation of the site, he was the Treasurer of South Australia.

Barrow Creek Telegraph Repeater Station
Barrow Creek was chosen as a site for an Overland Telegraph morse repeater station by John Ross in September 1871. The station was officially opened on 16 August 1872 by Charles Todd. It was one of 15 such repeater stations on a network traversing Australia and linking to Europe, providing essential communication services. A manned repeater station in newer buildings remained in operation until at least the 1970s. There was also a post office and telephone exchange servicing local cattle stations. The original Telegraph Station has been preserved and is now a monument to the troubles which beset the early days of the Territory.

Arrival of graziers in the area
In 1873, 5,000 sheep were overlanded from Adelaide by Alfred Giles for distribution to telegraph stations along the line. During 1877 and 1878, Alfred and Arthur Giles overlanded stock for W. J. Browne to the Katherine River. On the 1878 journey Frank Withall, a young Englishman, was included on the suggestion of Browne to gather some colonial experience. Alfred Giles later started Springvale, Delamere and the Newcastle Waters runs.

World War II
During World War II, Barrow Creek was used by the Australian Army as a staging camp for convoys of troops and supplies, which was known as No. 5 Australian Personnel Staging Camp. It was the first overnight stop on the northern trip from Alice Springs to Birdum.

Water limits Barrow Creek population
Barrow Creek has always had a problem with both quantity and quality of groundwater supplies. This problem was already recognized in the 1870s, and only 20 years after the Telegraph Station was built there is evidence of plans to shift it about 40 kilometres further north to the crossing at Taylor Creek because of better groundwater supplies. There is still a bore at that locality called New Barrow Bore. Today, the only good water at Barrow Creek is rainwater and that is limited due to the arid climate.

Crime

1870 killing
During 1870 some 3,000 sheep from the Lake Hope area in South Australia were overlanded to the Northern Territory, for the men working on the line at Roper River, by Ralph and John Milner. Near Wauchope Creek 900 sheep died after eating poisonous herbs. John Milner was killed by some Aboriginal people and Ralph arrived at the Roper River with only 1,000 sheep.

1874 Barrow Creek outrage and aftermath
On 22 February 1874, a group of Kaytetye men attacked the Overland Telegraph repeater station at Barrow Creek, whose staff were relaxing outside the compound, immediately killing linesman John Frank, mortally wounding Canadian telegraphist and stationmaster James Lawrence Stapleton (died on the following day) and injuring several others. A monument was erected at Barrow Creek to their memory (the spelling "Franks" is almost certainly incorrect). 
Contemporary press reports described the incident as the "Barrow's Creek outrage".

On orders from Adelaide, police trooper Samuel Gason recruited a group of volunteers to apprehend the perpetrators. Several Aboriginal people were killed in two separate battles over the two months that followed, with Gason reporting that some of the dead had been identified as having taken part in the 'outrage'. Anthropologist Ted Strehlow reported in 1932 that Alex Ross, who'd visited the area in 1875, doubted whether the real culprits had been found. "Well of course nobody ever knew," Ross was quoted as saying.

1928 Coniston Massacre

Barrow Creek was central to the last major Aboriginal massacre in the Northern Territory. In the 1920s Mounted Constable William George Murray was in charge of the local police station and also the Chief Protector of Aborigines in the area. When an old dingo trapper, Fred Brooks, was killed by Aboriginal people on Coniston Station, Murray led a posse which killed an estimated 70 Aboriginal people in a series of bloody reprisals. When Murray was called to Darwin to explain his actions he was greeted as a conquering hero. When asked why he had taken no prisoners he expressed the racist attitudes which prevailed at the time by telling the Darwin court "What use is a wounded black feller a hundred miles from civilisation?" He was exonerated of all charges.

2001 Peter Falconio disappearance

Barrow Creek is close to where Peter Falconio went missing, presumed murdered by Bradley John Murdoch, and Joanne Lees was abducted. The scene of the crime was 13 kilometres north of Barrow Creek. No body has been found.

Tourist spots

The graves
The graves are marked by a wall around the graves and headstones. They are well looked after. In a small graveyard at the front are remains of two telegraph station workers killed in a surprise attack by Aboriginals in 1874.

The pub
The old pub was built in 1926 by Joe Kilgariff, uncle of Northern Territory senator Bernie Kilgariff, and it still has the original old bar, underground cellar and tin ceilings. There is accommodation outside and rooms inside and a caravan park. On the wall in the kitchen of the building is a cartoon of two Australian comic icons, Bluey and Curley, drawn by the artist John Gurney when he passed through during World War II. The hotel is a popular stop for travellers along the highway and contains a tremendous collection of memorabilia and items of interest which have been gathered over the years. The current publican of 25 years, Lesley Pilton, initiated what he terms the "Barrow Creek Bank" - travellers post on the wall a signed banknote of their native country, "to be used in a later journey in case they need a beer".

Telegraph Station
For many years the telegraph station was the home of Tom Roberts, a linesman from Charters Towers who lived in the building and repaired breakdowns of the line. Now deceased, a corner of the hotel is devoted to his memory.

Popular culture 
Part of the Graham Masterton novel ‘’Lords of the Air’’ is set in Barrow Creek.

Climate

Current

Population
The population of Barrow Creek at the moment is four people who work at the roadhouse and nearby Aboriginal camp caretaker yard. There are two Aboriginal communities - the Tara community which is 12 km northeast and Pmatajunata at Stirling Station which is about 35 km from Barrow Creek. There are about 120 people there and 80 people at Tara.

Mining
On 19 March 2001 Glengarry Resources were issued with an exploration licence for tantalite in Barrow Creek.
On 17 November 2003 Barrow Creek Central Land Council agreed to allow Newmont and Normandy NFM to use an area north-west of Barrow Creek for exploration and mining for a period of 20 years.
On 26 May 2005 BHP Billiton commenced drilling at Barrow Creek to explore and develop nickel sulphide deposits.

See also
 List of massacres of Indigenous Australians

References

External links
Driving along the Stuart Highway - includes a snippet on Barrow Creek
AU info
Sydney Morning Herald Travel
Wilkins Tourist Maps
Repeater Stations along the Stuart Highway

Towns in the Northern Territory